Steve Kittrell (born November 1, 1948) is an American college baseball coach. Most recently, he was the head baseball coach at South Alabama. He owns a career record of 1052–644–1 in 25 seasons at South Alabama. He started his career as the head baseball coach at Niceville High School in Florida where he posted a 35–15 record in two seasons. From 1976 to 1978, he became the head baseball coach at University Military School in Mobile, Alabama, where he went 95–34. From 1979 to 1980, he coached at Enterprise State Junior College in Enterprise, Alabama, and had a two-season record of 52–30. In 1983, he coached at Spring Hill College, posting a 33–19 record.

Kittrell played baseball at South Alabama, and played one year in the Boston Red Sox organization, reaching Class-A Winter Haven.

He became the 50th coach in NCAA baseball history to reach the 1,000-win plateau on February 23, 2009. He has led the Jaguars to 18 NCAA tournament appearances, including 10 Sun Belt Conference championships. He is a member of the South Alabama Athletic Hall of Fame.

On June 25, 2010, Kittrell announced his plan to retire after the 2011 season.  Kittrell was replaced by Mark Calvi, former pitching coach for the University of South Carolina.

References

External links

1948 births
Living people
Baseball players from Alabama
Enterprise State Boll Weevils baseball coaches
High school baseball coaches in the United States
South Alabama Jaguars baseball coaches
South Alabama Jaguars baseball players
Spring Hill Badgers baseball coaches
Sportspeople from Mobile, Alabama
Winter Haven Red Sox players